Stigmella abachausi is a moth of the family Nepticulidae. It was described by Anthonie Johannes Theodorus Janse in 1948 and is endemic to Namibia.

References

Nepticulidae
Moths described in 1948
Endemic fauna of Namibia
Moths of Africa